Song Xiaoying is a Chinese film and television actress.

Filmography

References

External links
 

1954 births
Living people
Chinese film actresses
20th-century Chinese actresses
Chinese television actresses
21st-century Chinese actresses
Beijing Film Academy alumni
People from Baicheng
Actresses from Jilin